Mater Dei College is a Roman Catholic institution located in Tubigon, Bohol, Philippines.

Mater Dei College may also refer to:

 Mater Dei Catholic College, Wagga Wagga, New South Wales, Australia
 One of the colleges that formed St Peter's Catholic College, Tuggerah, New South Wales, Australia
 A high school in Edgewater, Western Australia
Mater Dei College (New York), a former school in Ogdensburg, New York